La storia di un peccato (English: The story of a sin) is a 1918 silent Italian drama film based on the novel by Polish writer Stefan Żeromski of the same title directed by Carmine Gallone.

Cast
 Soava Gallone
 Ciro Galvani
 Tony Kirkland
 Bruno Emanuel Palmi
 Mario Parpagnoli
 Guido Trento

References

External links
 

1918 films
1918 drama films
Italian silent feature films
Italian black-and-white films
Films directed by Carmine Gallone
Italian drama films
Silent drama films